Richárd Zsolnai (born 28 March 1995) is a Hungarian professional footballer who plays for Ajka.

Career
On 23 June 2022, Zsolnai returned to Ajka on a three-year contract.

Club statistics

Updated to games played as of 5 August 2020.

References

External links

1995 births
Footballers from Budapest
Living people
Hungarian footballers
Association football forwards
Vác FC players
Diósgyőri VTK players
Budafoki LC footballers
FC Ajka players
Nemzeti Bajnokság I players
Nemzeti Bajnokság II players